World Trophy Soccer is the name given to two distinct video games:

World Trophy Soccer, a 1989 game by Virgin Mastertronic later reworked as World Cup Soccer: Italia '90
World Trophy Soccer, a 1992 game for the Sega Genesis, a reworking of European Club Soccer

Amiga games
Atari ST games
Commodore 64 games